National Route 500 is a national highway of Japan connecting Beppu, Ōita and Tosu, Saga on the island of Kyushu, with a total length of 160.9 km (99.98 mi).

References

500
Roads in Fukuoka Prefecture
Roads in Ōita Prefecture
Roads in Saga Prefecture